The International Table Tennis Federation (ITTF) is the governing body for all national table tennis associations. The role of the ITTF includes overseeing rules and regulations and seeking technological improvement for the sport of table tennis. The ITTF is responsible for the organization of numerous international competitions, including the World Table Tennis Championships that has continued since 1926.

Founding history
The ITTF was founded in 1926 by William Henry Lawes from Wymondham, the nine founding members being Austria, Czechoslovakia, Denmark, England, Germany, Hungary, British India, Sweden, and Wales. The first international tournament was held in January 1926 in Berlin, while the first World Table Tennis Championships was held in December 1926 in London.

Toward the end of 2000, the ITTF instituted several rules changes aimed at making table tennis more viable as a televised spectator sport. The older 38 mm balls were officially replaced by 40 mm balls. This increased the ball's air resistance, and effectively slowed down the game. In 2003, the ITTF moved its headquarters from Hastings to Lausanne and set the ITTF Museum there.

In 2007, the governance for para table tennis was transferred from the International Paralympic Committee to the ITTF. In February 2008, the ITTF announced several rules changes after an ITTF Executive Meeting in Guangzhou, Guangdong, China with regards to a player's eligibility to play for a new association. The new ruling was to encourage associations to develop their own players.

In 2019, the ITTF created its subsidiary World Table Tennis (WTT) to manage all its commercial and events business. The ITTF's current headquarters are located in Lausanne while their Asia-Pacific office is based in Singapore and search for a new site for headquarters is in the process. The current president is Petra Sörling from Sweden. Sörling became the eighth person to hold the office in 2021.

Membership

The ITTF recognises five continental federations. There are currently 227 member associations within the ITTF.

Organisational structure
All member associations of the ITTF attend annual general meeting (AGM). Agendas on changes of the constitution, laws of table tennis, applications for membership etc. are discussed and finalised through votes. Also, the president of ITTF, 8 executive vice-presidents, and 32 or less continental representatives are elected at an AGM, serving for a four-year term. The president, executive vice-presidents, and the chairman of the athletes' commission compose executive committee.

The executive committee, continental representatives and presidents of the five continental federations or their appointees compose the board of directors (Board). The Board manages the work of the ITTF between AGMs. Several committees, commissions, working groups or panels work under the constitution of ITTF or under the Board.

Role in diplomacy
Unlike the organisations for more popular sports, the ITTF tends to recognise teams from generally unrecognised governing bodies for disputed territory. For example, it recognised the Table Tennis Federation of Kosovo in 2003 even though Kosovo was excluded from most other sports. It recognised the People's Republic of China in 1953 and allowed some basic diplomacy which lead to an opening for U.S. President Richard Nixon, called "Ping Pong Diplomacy", in the early 1970s.

The ITTF also approved unified Korean team to compete at the World Table Tennis Championships in 1991 and 2018. In reaction to the 2022 Russian invasion of Ukraine, the ITTF banned Russian and Belarusian players and officials from its competitions.

Rules

Player eligibility
For ITTF world title events, a player is eligible to play for his association by registering with the ITTF. If the player chooses to play for a new association, he shall register with the ITTF, through the new association. The player will be eligible to play for the new association after three, five, seven years after the date of registration, if the player is under the age of 15, 18, 21 respectively. The player will be eligible to play for the new association after nine years if the player is at least 21 years old.

Service and point system
The table tennis point system was reduced from a 21 to an 11-point scoring system in 2001. A game shall be won by the player or pair first scoring 11 points unless both players or pairs score 10 points, when the game shall be won by the first player or pair subsequently gaining a lead of 2 points. This was intended to make games more fast-paced and exciting. The ITTF also changed the rules on service to prevent a player from hiding the ball during service, in order to increase the average length of rallies and to reduce the server's advantage. Today, the game changes from time to time mainly to improve on the excitement for television viewers.

Speed glue ban

In 2007, ITTF's board of directors in Zagreb decided to implement the VOC-free glue rule at Junior events, starting from 1 January 2008, as a transitional period before the full implementation of the VOC ban on 1 September 2008.

As of 1 January 2009, all speed glue was to have been banned.

Contests and rankings

The ITTF and its subsidiary WTT hold international tournaments and the ITTF maintains official world ranking lists based on players' results in tournaments throughout the year.

Conventions: MT/WT: men's/women's team; MS/WS: men's/women's singles; MD/WD: men's/women's doubles; XD: mixed doubles
Major international events

Junior events

Para events

ITTF Museum
The ITTF Museum was previously in Lausanne, Switzerland, where the ITTF is based. The ITTF decided in 2014 to move the museum to Shanghai, China, which was planning the China Table Tennis Museum around the same time. The new museum was designated in the same building with the China Table Tennis Museum on different floors, managed and operated by Shanghai University of Sport, and officially opened in 2018.

See also
List of international sports federations
ITTF Hall of Fame
ITTF Star Awards
World Table Tennis (ITTF)

References

External links

 
 ITTF Para Table Tennis
 Official ITTF World Ranking Table

 
Organisations based in Lausanne
Table tennis organizations
Sports world rankings
Organizations established in 1926